Almir Memić (born 16 October 1975 in Sarajevo, SR Bosnia-Herzegovina, SFR Yugoslavia) is a Bosnian retired football player. He spent a large part of his career in Austria and was part of the Bosnia and Herzegovina national team.

Playing career

Club
Memić played for Bosnian giants Željezničar and moved abroad to join Austrian Bundesliga side LASK Linz in 2000. He later played for Austrian lower league sides.

International
He made his debut for Bosnia and Herzegovina in an August 1999 friendly match away against Liechtenstein and has earned a total of 2 caps, scoring no goals. His second and final international was a January 2000 friendly against Qatar.

Managerial career
After hanging up his boots, Memić became a manager at SV Krenglbach and managed other Austrian amateur sides.

References

External links

1975 births
Living people
Footballers from Sarajevo
Association football forwards
Bosnia and Herzegovina footballers
Bosnia and Herzegovina international footballers
FK Željezničar Sarajevo players
LASK players
SV Gmunden players
Premier League of Bosnia and Herzegovina players
Austrian Football Bundesliga players
2. Liga (Austria) players
Austrian Landesliga players
Bosnia and Herzegovina expatriate footballers
Expatriate footballers in Austria
Bosnia and Herzegovina expatriate sportspeople in Austria
Bosnia and Herzegovina football managers
Bosnia and Herzegovina expatriate football managers
Expatriate football managers in Austria